Sobolevo is the name of several rural localities in Russia:
Sobolevo, Bryansk Oblast, a village in Peklinsky Rural Administrative Okrug of Dubrovsky District in Bryansk Oblast; 
Sobolevo, Ivanovo Oblast, a selo in Yuryevetsky District of Ivanovo Oblast
Sobolevo, Kaliningrad Oblast, a settlement in Kamensky Rural Okrug of Chernyakhovsky District in Kaliningrad Oblast
Sobolevo, Kaluga Oblast, a village in Ferzikovsky District of Kaluga Oblast
Sobolevo, Kamchatka Krai, a selo in Sobolevsky District of Kamchatka Krai
Sobolevo, Kirov Oblast, a village in Lyumpanursky Rural Okrug of Sanchursky District in Kirov Oblast; 
Sobolevo, Krasnoselsky District, Kostroma Oblast, a village in Priskokovskoye Settlement of Krasnoselsky District in Kostroma Oblast; 
Sobolevo, Ponazyrevsky District, Kostroma Oblast, a village in Khmelevskoye Settlement of Ponazyrevsky District in Kostroma Oblast; 
Sobolevo, Soligalichsky District, Kostroma Oblast, a village in Vasilyevskoye Settlement of Soligalichsky District in Kostroma Oblast; 
Sobolevo, Susaninsky District, Kostroma Oblast, a village in Sumarokovskoye Settlement of Susaninsky District in Kostroma Oblast; 
Sobolevo, Moscow Oblast, a village in Sobolevskoye Rural Settlement of Orekhovo-Zuyevsky District in Moscow Oblast; 
Sobolevo, Chkalovsky District, Nizhny Novgorod Oblast, a village in Kuznetsovsky Selsoviet of Chkalovsky District in Nizhny Novgorod Oblast; 
Sobolevo, Gaginsky District, Nizhny Novgorod Oblast, a selo in Pokrovsky Selsoviet of Gaginsky District in Nizhny Novgorod Oblast; 
Sobolevo, Sokolsky District, Nizhny Novgorod Oblast, a village in Volzhsky Selsoviet of Sokolsky District in Nizhny Novgorod Oblast; 
Sobolevo, Vachsky District, Nizhny Novgorod Oblast, a village in Chulkovsky Selsoviet of Vachsky District in Nizhny Novgorod Oblast; 
Sobolevo, Demyansky District, Novgorod Oblast, a village in Ilyinogorskoye Settlement of Demyansky District in Novgorod Oblast
Sobolevo, Starorussky District, Novgorod Oblast, a village in Mednikovskoye Settlement of Starorussky District in Novgorod Oblast
Sobolevo, Orenburg Oblast, a selo in Sobolevsky Selsoviet of Pervomaysky District in Orenburg Oblast
Sobolevo, Perm Krai, a village in Yusvinsky District of Perm Krai
Sobolevo, Ryazan Oblast, a selo in Melekshinsky Rural Okrug of Starozhilovsky District in Ryazan Oblast
Sobolevo, Smolensk Oblast, a village in Sobolevskoye Rural Settlement of Monastyrshchinsky District in Smolensk Oblast
Sobolevo, Andreapolsky District, Tver Oblast, a village in Andreapolskoye Rural Settlement of Andreapolsky District in Tver Oblast
Sobolevo, Kimrsky District, Tver Oblast, a village in Fedorovskoye Rural Settlement of Kimrsky District in Tver Oblast
Sobolevo, Oleninsky District, Tver Oblast, a village in Glazkovskoye Rural Settlement of Oleninsky District in Tver Oblast
Sobolevo, Vladimir Oblast, a village in Muromsky District of Vladimir Oblast
Sobolevo, Cherepovetsky District, Vologda Oblast, a village in Yaganovsky Selsoviet of Cherepovetsky District in Vologda Oblast
Sobolevo, Kirillovsky District, Vologda Oblast, a village in Nikolo-Torzhsky Selsoviet of Kirillovsky District in Vologda Oblast
Sobolevo, Sheksninsky District, Vologda Oblast, a village in Yurochensky Selsoviet of Sheksninsky District in Vologda Oblast
Sobolevo, Ustyuzhensky District, Vologda Oblast, a village in Soshnevsky Selsoviet of Ustyuzhensky District in Vologda Oblast
Sobolevo, Velikoustyugsky District, Vologda Oblast, a village in Verkhnevarzhensky Selsoviet of Velikoustyugsky District in Vologda Oblast
Sobolevo, Breytovsky District, Yaroslavl Oblast, a village in Sevastyantsevsky Rural Okrug of Breytovsky District in Yaroslavl Oblast
Sobolevo, Lyubimsky District, Yaroslavl Oblast, a village in Troitsky Rural Okrug of Lyubimsky District in Yaroslavl Oblast
Sobolevo, Pereslavsky District, Yaroslavl Oblast, a village in Dubrovitsky Rural Okrug of Pereslavsky District in Yaroslavl Oblast

See also
Sobolewo, disambiguation between places in Poland